Nichelle is a given name. Notable people with the name include:

Nichelle Nichols (1932–2022), American actress, singer, and voice artist
Nichelle Prince (born 1995), Canadian soccer player
Nichelle Tramble Spellman (born 1967), American television producer and writer

See also
Nischelle Turner, American reporter and correspondent
Michelle (name)